Maureen "Mo" O'Toole (born March 24, 1961)  is an accomplished American water polo player and coach. In over 30 years in the sport, she set multiple firsts for women in water polo, received all the top honors, and in her time was recognized as one of the best water polo players in the world.

Life 
O'Toole started playing water polo during the swimming off-season at age thirteen. At Wilson High School in Long Beach, California she joined boys' water polo because there was no girls' team.  She played at Long Beach City College on the men's team for national team coach Monte Nitzkowski. She attended the University of Hawaii on a swimming scholarship, since there were no water polo scholarships for women at that time.

At age 17, O'Toole was invited to join the U.S. Women's National Water Polo Team.  "Mo" (as her teammates called her) was a constant figure on the team from 1978 to 1994, except in 1991 when she gave birth to her daughter Kelly.
She participated in the 1979 FINA World Cup, winning a gold medal.
When women's water polo was added to the 2000 Summer Olympics, Maureen re-joined the US team out of retirement in 1997 and helped qualify the US women's team as one of the six teams eligible to participate in Sydney. At age 39, she was the oldest and the only water polo player over 30 and at the Olympic Games, helping the US women win an Olympic silver medal.

She has coached water polo at Rio Hondo College in Whittier, California and at UC Berkeley from 1995 to 1997, and has a master's degree in education. In April 2006, Maureen O’Toole, was selected as a 2006 United States Olympic Committee Coach of the Year top five finalist, the first female water polo coach to receive this honor.

Now retired from competitive water polo, Maureen is the founder of The Pursuit of Excellence Sports Academy, a non-profit foundation that teaches self-esteem and leadership training in a sports environment for girls 8–18 years of age. She also does motivational speaking to various companies about teamwork. In April 2005, Maureen O'Toole married Jim Purcell, once a national and international championship water polo player and now coach of the Monte Vista High School women's water polo team. Her nephew, Tommy O'Toole, is a top high school baseball prospect, getting offers from colleges as a sophomore.

Achievements
 Most Valuable Player of the US Women's National Team 15 times
 U.S. Water Polo Female Athlete of the Year 5 times
 World Water Polo Female Athlete of the Year 6 times
 All American team for U.S. Water Polo a record 28 times
 2000 Summer Olympics Silver Medalist
 California Community College Sports Hall of Fame, 2002
 USA Water Polo Hall of Fame, 2003
 Coaches Diablo Water polo in northern California and her team of 14 and under girls has become very successful and won the 2014 Turbo Cup in Texas.

See also
 List of Olympic medalists in water polo (women)
 List of World Aquatics Championships medalists in water polo

References

 
 O'Toole, post Olympics

External links
 

1961 births
Living people
University of Hawaiʻi alumni
American female water polo players
Water polo players at the 2000 Summer Olympics
Wilson Classical High School alumni
Medalists at the 2000 Summer Olympics
Olympic silver medalists for the United States in water polo
World Aquatics Championships medalists in water polo
World Games silver medalists
Competitors at the 1981 World Games
American water polo coaches
Sportspeople from Long Beach, California
20th-century American women